Troy Smith (born 1984) is an American football quarterback.

Troy Smith may also refer to:

Troy Smith (wide receiver) (born 1977), American football wide receiver
Troy Smith (footballer) (born 1987), Jamaican international footballer
Troy Smith (businessman) (1922–2009), American entrepreneur
Troy Smith (politician), member of the Mississippi House of Representatives

See also
Trey Smith (disambiguation)